The 1984 Kansas Jayhawks football team represented the University of Kansas in the Big Eight Conference during the 1984 NCAA Division I-A football season. In their second season under head coach Mike Gottfried, the Jayhawks compiled a 5–6 record (4–3 against conference opponents), finished in fourth place in the conference, and were outscored by opponents by a combined total of 298 to 218. They played their home games at Memorial Stadium in Lawrence, Kansas.

The Jayhawks defeated in-state opponent Wichita State 31–7 in what was the final game the two schools played before Wichita State eliminated their football program following the 1986 season.

The team's statistical leaders included Mike Norseth with 1,682 passing yards, Lynn Williams with 776 rushing yards, and Richard Estell with 500 receiving yards. Sylvester Byrd, Willie Pless, and Bennie Simecka were the team captains.

Schedule

References

Kansas
Kansas Jayhawks football seasons
Kansas Jayhawks football